Hyaleucerea is a genus of moths in the subfamily Arctiinae. The genus was erected by Arthur Gardiner Butler in 1875.

Species
 Hyaleucerea chapmani Klages, 1906
 Hyaleucerea costinotatum (Dognin, 1900)
 Hyaleucerea erythrotelus (Walker, 1854)
 Hyaleucerea fusiformis (Walker, 1856)
 Hyaleucerea gigantea (Druce, 1884)
 Hyaleucerea grandis Schaus, 1921
 Hyaleucerea lemoulti (Schaus, 1905)
 Hyaleucerea leucoprocta Dognin, 1909
 Hyaleucerea leucosticta Druce, 1905
 Hyaleucerea lugubris Schaus, 1901
 Hyaleucerea manicorensis Rego Barros, 1971
 Hyaleucerea mundula (Berg, 1882)
 Hyaleucerea ockendeni Rothschild, 1912
 Hyaleucerea panacea (Druce, 1884)
 Hyaleucerea phaeosoma Hampson, 1905
 Hyaleucerea sororia Schaus, 1910
 Hyaleucerea trifasciata (Butler, 1877)
 Hyaleucerea uniformis Rothschild, 1912

Former species
 Hyaleucerea agylloides Dyar, 1912
 Hyaleucerea luctuosa Möschler, 1877
 Hyaleucerea picticeps Hampson, 1903
 Hyaleucerea vulnerata Butler, 1875

References

External links

Euchromiina
Moth genera